Maurice Pivar (11 August 1894 in Manchester, United Kingdom – 14 June 1982 in Los Angeles, California, United States) was an English-American film editor, producer and writer. He edited 21 films, oversaw editing of 59 films, produced 4 films and wrote the dialogue descript to the film The Cohens and the Kellys in Africa between years 1921 and 1936. He died of a heart attack at the age of 88.

Selected filmography
Sensation Seekers (1927)
Iron Man (1931)
 Storm Over the Andes (1935)

External links 

British film editors
British film producers
Mass media people from Manchester
British emigrants to the United States
1894 births
1982 deaths
American film editors
20th-century British screenwriters